Kaitaba Stadium is a multi-use stadium in Bukoba, Tanzania.  It is currently used mostly for football matches, on club level by Kagera Sugar of the Tanzanian Premier League. The stadium has a capacity of 5,000 spectators.

References

Football venues in Tanzania
Bukoba
Buildings and structures in the Kagera Region